Tarap is a 2020 Pakistani drama television series that premiered on Hum TV on 29 March 2020. It is produced by Babar Javed and MD Productions and directed by Nadeem Siddiqui. It features Syed Jibran and Hiba Bukhari in lead roles. The supporting cast includes Babar Ali, Waseem Abbas, Nausheen Shah and Saleem Mairaj. Tarap is a story of hardship, sacrifice, and love which shapes the characters and plot. The drama initially aired every Sunday at 9:10 pm, then in Ramadan aired every Saturday and Sunday night at 9:10 pm, resuming back to one day normally.

Cast 
 Syed Jibran as Adil 
 Hiba Bukhari as Zunaira
 Babar Ali as Laeeq
 Nausheen Shah as Faiqa
 Beenish Chohan as Nida
 Faiza Gillani as Adil's ex wife
 Lubna Aslam as Sadia
 Jahanzeb Khan as Sameer
 Saleem Mairaj as Arshad Hussain
 Laiba Khan as Hania
 Beena Masroor as Zunaira's grandmother
 Farah Nadir as Zunaira Aapa
 Ghazala Butt as Rabia's mother
 Farah Nadeem as Salma
 Sajiruddin 
 Akbar Subhani
 Arez Ahmed as Faris

Episodes

Soundtrack

The original soundtrack is composed by Denis Tanveer with lyrics written and performed by Khurram Iqbal.

References

External links
 Official website

Hum TV original programming
2020 Pakistani television series debuts
Pakistani drama television series
Urdu-language television shows
2020s Pakistani television series
Pakistani romantic drama television series
Television series by MD Productions
MD Productions
2020 Pakistani television series endings